William Hartmann may refer to:
 William Kenneth Hartmann, planetary scientist and author at the Planetary Science Institute
 William M. Hartmann (born 1939), physicist, psychoacoustician at Michigan State University